Ezgi Asaroğlu (born 18 June 1987) is a Turkish film and television actress.

Life and career 
She first appeared on cable TV in the TV series Bir Dilim Aşk, which marked her screen debut at age 17. During the years, she had roles in the top-rated TV series and the popularity of the series made Ezgi Asaroglu well known to audiences in Turkey. In 2005, she appeared in the short movie What's Love Doing in the Mountains? which won awards at film festivals around the world.

Ezgi's film career started with her role in the 2008 award-winning independent film, For a Moment, Freedom (aka Ein Augenblick Freiheit), a biting, tragicomic refugee drama which has won 30 international awards. Since then, she has taken on starring roles. In 2009, she starred in Kampüste Çıplak Ayaklar (aka Barefoot on Campus). Her performance received critical acclaim, and other successful films followed, including Acı Aşk, En Mutlu Olduğum Yer, Aşk Kırmızı, Cennetten Kovulmak (which earned her "Best Actress Award" from Dublin Silk Road Film Festival), Sağ Salim 2: Sil Baştan.

After comedy series Leyla ile Mecnun and Yağmurdan Kaçarken, she began starring in a drama series O Hayat Benim. The series continued for four seasons, one hundred thirty-one episodes and also broadcast in several countries with a huge success which gained international recognition to Asaroglu. The fact that she chooses different roles each time makes her resume interesting. Just as in her bipolar character in Mucize Doktor which was more challenging role than the others for sure. And once again she put on a memorable performance.

Filmography

In other media

References

External links
 Ezgi Asaroğlu Official Website
 

Living people
Actresses from Istanbul
Actresses from İzmir
Turkish film actresses
Turkish television actresses
1987 births
Turkish child actresses